Sarah Gray Rafferty (born December 6, 1972) is an American actress, widely known for her role as Donna Paulsen on the USA Network legal drama Suits.

Early life and education
Rafferty grew up as the youngest of four daughters in the Riverside neighborhood of Greenwich, Connecticut. She credits her mother, Mary Lee Rafferty, the Chairwoman of the English Department at Convent of the Sacred Heart school, and her father, Michael Griffin Rafferty Jr., who enjoys two successful careers in finance and oil painting, for cultivating her passion for the arts. Her sisters are Maura, Ann, and Constance.

Rafferty studied at Phillips Academy in Andover, Massachusetts, and graduated in 1989. She majored in English and Theatre at Hamilton College, studied theatre abroad in the United Kingdom and at the University of Oxford during her junior year, and, after graduating magna cum laude from Hamilton in 1993, went on to study at the Yale School of Drama, receiving a Master of Fine Arts.

Personal life
Rafferty's husband is Aleksanteri Olli-Pekka Seppälä, an American of Finnish descent, who is an equity research analyst in the asset management unit of Lazard Frères & Company. They married on June 23, 2001, at the Roman Catholic church of St. Mary in Greenwich, Connecticut, and have two daughters, Oona Gray and Iris Friday.

She and her Suits co-star Gabriel Macht have been friends since 1993, when they met at the Williamstown Theatre Festival.
Rafferty was one of the guests at Meghan Markle’s wedding to Prince Harry at St George's Chapel, Windsor Castle on May 19, 2018.

Filmography

Film

Television

References

External links 

 
 

1972 births
Actresses from Connecticut
American film actresses
American television actresses
Living people
People from New Canaan, Connecticut
Yale School of Drama alumni
20th-century American actresses
21st-century American actresses
Phillips Academy alumni
Hamilton College (New York) alumni
People from Riverside, Connecticut